Shankel is a surname. Notable people with the surname include:
 Del Shankel (1927–2018), American microbiologist
 Shaun Shankel, American songwriter

Americanized surnames